Alfons Van Hecke (22 April 1891 – 1 October 1959) was a Belgian racing cyclist. He rode in the 1920 Tour de France.

References

1891 births
1959 deaths
Belgian male cyclists
Place of birth missing